The Blue and White Lion is a 1952 West German comedy film directed by Werner Jacobs and Olf Fischer and starring Wastl Witt, Elise Aulinger and Lore Frisch. It was shot at the Bavaria Studios in Munich. The film's sets were designed by Franz Bi and Bruno Monden.

Selected Cast
Wastl Witt as Josef Filser
Elise Aulinger as Theres Filser
Lore Frisch as Zenzi Filser
Paul Kürzinger as Hias, Knecht
Eliezer Schnall as Doctor Hans Friedrich Knust
Hans Fitz as Haslinger, Postwirt und Bürgermeister
Hannes Keppler as Michl Haslinger
Barbara Gallauner as Zilli, Kellnerin
Rudolf Schündler as Herr von Kleewitz
Mady Rahl as Frau von Kleewitz
Willi Rose as Fritz Stüve, Reisender
Ernst Fritz Fürbringer as Vorsitzender des Gerichts
Erich Ponto as Regierungspräsident

See also
Onkel Filser – Allerneueste Lausbubengeschichten (1966)

References

Bibliography
Goble, Alan. The Complete Index to Literary Sources in Film. Walter de Gruyter, 1999.

External links

1952 comedy films
German comedy films
West German films
Films directed by Werner Jacobs
German black-and-white films
1950s German films
1950s German-language films
Films shot at Bavaria Studios